Maspion Holdings Corporation, also known as the Maspion Group or simply known as Maspion (stylized as MASPION), is a group of autonomous Indonesian conglomerate and multinational companies, based in Surabaya, East Java. It was founded by Alim Husin in 1962.

The company employs around 30,000 people (2016) and has 44 subsidiaries. It has production facilities spread across four industrial areas in Sidoarjo and Gresik, East Java, and one factory in Jakarta and West Java.

History 
Maspion was founded in 1962 from a small home industry that produced kitchen equipment, managed by Alim Husin and his partner Gunardi Go. The home business at that time was named UD Logam Djawa. Starting from this small business, the founder started a business that gradually developed into a big industry. This business is developing not only a product that is limited to making kitchen equipment made of aluminum but has expanded to the manufacture of kitchen utensils from plastic. In 1970, Alim Husin's family business progressed so much that he designed a new name and logo under the name Jin Feng (top of gold), and changed the name of the company to MASPION, the Indonesian language short from Mengajak Anda Selalu Percaya Industri Olahan Nasional ("Inviting You to Always Trust the National Industry"). This is in line with the establishment of a company labeled Maspion since 1971. Three years later, the company began producing PVC pipes and accessories. With this type of business the company's production is increasingly diverse. Since 1975, Maspion has also begun to develop the home electrical appliances business as well as stainless steel kitchen utensils.

Maspion Group in expanding its business cooperates with top-class companies, including Samsung, Marubeni, Komatsu, Sumitomo Metals, Kawasaki Steel, Satachi, Seven Seas Chemicals, and Siam Cement. Besides selling domestically, Maspion products are also exported to the United States, Japan, Australia, Europe and the Middle East. Maspion's export value in 1995 reached US$ 100 million dollars. The company also has a representative office in Toronto, Canada.

Products and Services 
Current
 Maxim
 Maspion Electronics
 Tivoli
 Maspion Plastic
 Plasticwares
 Vanda Melamine
 Panda
 Maslon
 Aubecq
 Logam Jawa
 Ishizuka
 PVC
 Meglio
Bank Maspion
Former
 Uchida (discontinued on October 1, 2018, following by Panasonic that phased out the National in 2008)
 Doff (discontinued)

Sponsorships
In 2022, Maspion Holdings became the official sponsor of the AFF Mitsubishi Electric Cup 2022 chosen by Mitsubishi Electric, along with Gree, Wuling, Mercedes-Benz, Tiger Brokers and Yanmar.

References

External links 

 Maspion Group official website
 Maspion Electronics official website

Conglomerate companies of Indonesia
Indonesian companies established in 1962
Conglomerate companies established in 1962
Indonesian brands
Companies based in Surabaya